David Middleton Robbie (6 October 1899 – 4 December 1978) was a Scottish footballer who played as an outside right. Born in Motherwell, he began his career with Bathgate, before moving to England in 1921, where he spent 14 years playing for Bury, scoring 102 goals in 420 league appearances, including scoring four goals in a single match against Barnsley in the 1931–32 season. In July 1935, he joined Plymouth Argyle but made just three appearances in two months with the club before joining Manchester United on a one-month trial, at the end of which he joined Margate. Four months later, he joined Luton Town, before returning to Plymouth as a coach at the end of the 1935–36 season. Two years later, he moved back to Bury, where he served as the club's trainer until his retirement.

References

External links
Profile at StretfordEnd.co.uk
Profile at MUFCinfo.com

1899 births
1978 deaths
Scottish footballers
Manchester United F.C. players
Bury F.C. players
Plymouth Argyle F.C. players
Footballers from Motherwell
Association football outside forwards
English Football League players
Bathgate F.C. players